Andrey Gromov (1887 — 1922) was a Russian film actor. Gromov played in about 40 films.

Selected filmography 
 1909 — 16th Century Russian Wedding
 1909 — Mazeppa
 1909 — Boyarin Orsha
 1910 — The Water Nymph
 1910 — The Queen of Spades
 1911 — Defence of Sevastopol
 1912 — 1812
 1913 — Uncle's Apartment
 1914 — Silent Witnesses
 1916 — Mirages
 1917 — The Dying Swan

References

External links 
 АНДРЕЙ ГРОМОВ

Russian male film actors
Male actors from Moscow
1887 births
1922 deaths
20th-century Russian male actors